Golab Mostaan (13 November 1953)  known professionally as Golab Adineh, is an Iranian actress. She has received various accolades, including a Crystal Simorgh, a Hafez Award, an Iran Cinema Celebration Awards and a Golden Rooster Award.

Personal life
She is daughter of Iranian novelist Hosseingholi Mosta'an. She was married to Iranian actor Mehdi Hashemi. She has a daughter from that marriage named Noura Hashemi who is also an actress.

Filmography
 Soltan-O-Shaban (1981-1984)
Canary Yellow (film) (1988)
 Rusari Abi (1995, aka The Blue Veiled)
Mojezeye khandeh (1996)
 Fasl-e panjom (1997, aka The Fifth Season)
 Banoo-ye Ordibehesht (1998 - aka The May Lady)
 Zir-e poost-e shahr (2001, aka Under the Skin of the City)
 Zendan-e Zanan (2002, aka Women's Prison)
 Mehman-e Maman (2004, aka Mom's Guest)
 Tales (2014)

Theater
The Sad Widows of the Warlord (بیوه های غمگین سالار جنگ)
Death of Yazdgerd, Director
Soltan mar''' (1998), DirectorShabi dar Tehran (1999), DirectorMadam Pipi (1999), ActressDastanhaie wiani (2000), ActressGilgamesh (2002), ActressMedea (2004)Dar mesr barf nemibaradShir haye KhanBaba Saltane, ActressBanooye Mahboob Man''(2022), Director

References

External links

Golab Adineh on Iran Teater
Golab Adineh on Soure Cinema

1953 births
Living people
People from Tehran
Actresses from Tehran
Iranian film actresses
Iranian stage actresses
Iranian television actresses
20th-century Iranian actresses
21st-century Iranian actresses
Shahid Beheshti University alumni
Crystal Simorgh for Best Supporting Actress winners